Dioguardi or DioGuardi is a surname. Notable people with the surname include:

Giovanni Dioguardi, also known as Johnny Dio, (1914–1979), American labor racketeer
Joe DioGuardi (born 1940), American politician
Kara DioGuardi (born 1970), American singer-songwriter
Nick Dioguardi (1932–2015), Italian-born American racing driver
Pasta Dioguardi, Argentine actor
Patrizia Dioguardi, Italian-Canadian singer better known as Patrizia